70th Street may refer to:

 70th Street (Manhattan), an east–west street in Manhattan, New York City
 70th Street (San Diego Trolley station), a San Diego Trolley station served by the Green Line in La Mesa, California